Mark Greaney (born 1967) is an American novelist focusing on thriller. He is best known as Tom Clancy's collaborator on his final books during his lifetime, and for continuing the Jack Ryan character and the Tom Clancy universe following Clancy's death in 2013. He is also known for the Gray Man series of novels, which was produced by Netflix into a feature film.

Early life and education
Born in Memphis, Tennessee, he is the son of Ed Greaney, a presence at WMC-TV Memphis for over 50 years and the namesake for the station's current newsroom. Greaney has degrees in political science and international relations, which would later play a major part in his writing career.

Career

The Gray Man 
Greaney previously worked as a waiter and bartender for ten years, then later in a surgical technology company, while working on two novels in his spare time. After finishing one of them, titled Goon Squad and was primarily about the aftermath of the Bosnian civil war, he gave the first 20 pages of his work to his favorite author Ralph Peters's agent, Scott Miller, in a book conference in September 2006. Miller liked the book but later did not go forward with it, saying that "it was unmarketable," according to Greaney. But he urged Greaney to write another one based from a character in Goon Squad named Court Gentry, which would later be The Gray Man. After finishing this novel, Miller agreed to represent him, and later found a publisher, Jove Books.

The national success of The Gray Man made Greaney quit his job in the medical devices company and make the transition to becoming a full-time writer. He was later given a three-book deal by his publisher in 2009. In addition, The Gray Mans success spawned an equally successful series, with eight more sequels as of 2021: On Target (2010), Ballistic (2011), Dead Eye (2013), Back Blast (2016), Gunmetal Gray (2017), Agent in Place (2018), Mission Critical (2019), One Minute Out (2020), Relentless (2021), and Sierra Six (2022).

The film adaptation of The Gray Man was directed by Joe and Anthony Russo for Netflix, with Ryan Gosling as Gentry and Chris Evans as nemesis Lloyd.

Working with Tom Clancy 
Greaney has been a fan of Tom Clancy for years and has read all of his books, beginning with Patriot Games. So when Clancy was looking for a new co-author, Greaney found out that his editor at Berkley Books, Tom Colgan was also Clancy's editor at G. P. Putnam's Sons. His editor later referred to his agent, who asked Greaney to be Clancy's co-author. Commenting on the experience, Greaney recalled: "I wish I could say I was excited, but the truth is, I was terrified. After I caught my breath, I offered to 'try out' because there were some other authors also in the running. I wrote twenty-five pages, handed them in and soon thereafter, I was in Baltimore meeting with Tom Clancy." They later collaborated on Clancy's last three novels before his death in October 2013: Locked On (2012), Threat Vector (2013), and Command Authority (2013).

After Clancy's death, with the backing of his family and estate, Greaney continued the Jack Ryan and The Campus Universe left behind by Clancy, and has written four more novels as of 2016: Tom Clancy: Support and Defend (2014), Tom Clancy: Full Force and Effect (2014), Tom Clancy: Commander in Chief (2015) and Tom Clancy: True Faith and Allegiance (2016). Regarding the publisher's decision to feature Clancy's name at the top in massive letters and having his name in smaller letters for the covers of the post-Clancy novels, Greaney commented: "It really feels like a humongous honor to do it. I get pretty good billing. The Tom Clancy name is one thing you can put on your book that will make it stand out from across the room".

On 19 February 2017, Greaney announced that he will exit the Jack Ryan Universe franchise. Replacing Greaney will be novelist Marc Cameron, previously known for his Jericho Quinn series of thrillers. Greaney later said of his departure from the Jack Ryan universe:

Other works
Greaney's first standalone work, a military thriller titled Red Metal and co-authored with Lieutenant Colonel H. Ripley Rawlings IV, USMC, was released on 16 July 2019. The novel debuted on the New York Times Bestseller list in August 2019. This was the first time Greaney appeared in the NYT Bestseller's list twice in the same calendar year. The book is notable for its comparisons to Clancy's novel Red Storm Rising (1986), which is also his first standalone novel that deals with a large scale military conflict between NATO and Russia.

In 2020, Greaney and Rawlings both announced via social media and web interviews that they had been contracted by Penguin Publishers to write the next in the Red Metal series. The release date was unspecified but was said to be sometime in 2021. Greaney's audiobook thriller Armored was released on 9 December 2021, and will be adapted by Sony Pictures and producer Michael Bay.

Personal life
Greaney continues to reside in Memphis, Tennessee with his wife Allison.

Bibliography

The Gray Man series
 The Gray Man (2009)
 On Target (2010)
 Ballistic (2011)
 Dead Eye (2013)
 Back Blast (2016)
 Gunmetal Gray (2017)
 Agent in Place (2018)
 Mission Critical (2019)
 One Minute Out (2020)
 Relentless (2021)
 Sierra Six (2022)
 Burner (2023)

Jack Ryan series
Featuring characters created by Tom Clancy
 Locked On – with Tom Clancy (2011)
 Threat Vector – with Tom Clancy (2012) 
 Command Authority – with Tom Clancy (2013)
 Tom Clancy: Support and Defend (2014) 
 Tom Clancy: Full Force and Effect (2014)
 Tom Clancy: Commander in Chief (2015)
 Tom Clancy: True Faith and Allegiance (2016)

Standalone novels
 Red Metal (with Lieutenant Colonel H. Ripley Rawlings IV) (2019)
 Unnamed sequel (with Lieutenant Colonel H. Ripley Rawlings IV) (2021)

References

External links 
 Mark Greaney Books
 Audio Interview with Mark Greaney Talking about "True Faith and Allegiance", 6 December 2016
 Modern Signed Books BlogTalkRadio Interview with Mark Greaney Talking about "Gun Metal Gray", 28 March 2017

21st-century American novelists
American male novelists
Living people
21st-century American male writers
1967 births
20th-century American novelists
20th-century American male writers